Welle can refer to:
The German word for wave used by the Wehrmacht to designate groups of divisions recruited in a given period of time.
the river Wel in Poland
the former Roman Catholic missionary Prefecture Apostolic of Welle in Congo
Welle, Germany, a village in the district of Harburg, Lower Saxony, Germany
The Wave (2008 film) (Die Welle), a 2008 German film based on the Third Wave experiment
Deutsche Welle, Germany's international broadcast station
Alan Welle (born 1945), American politician and businessman